Paolo Zamboni (born 25 March 1957, Ferrara, Italy) is an Italian doctor and scientist. He is full Professor and Director of the School of Vascular Surgery at the University of Ferrara in Italy.

He is known to have discovered, identified and described a vascular disease called chronic cerebrospinal venous insufficiency (CCSVI) strongly related with multiple sclerosis and other neurodegenerative diseases such as Ménière and Parkinson.

Biography
Graduated with honors in Medicine and Surgery in 1982, Zamboni specialized in General Surgery in 1987 and in Vascular Surgery 1992. In 1992 he obtained the fellowship at the Department of Vascular Surgery of the University of California in San Francisco. From 1993 to 2000 he was visiting professor at the Department of Surgery of the Uniformed Services University of the Health Sciences of Bethesda, Maryland and from 2008 to 2012 at the Jacobs Institute of Neurology in Buffalo, New York, and at the Neuroscience Department of Harvard University (2010) and Chicago University (2012).

Since 2004 he is director of the Vascular Disease Center of Ferrara University. In 2008 he announced the discovery of a new venous pathology, called chronic cerebrospinal venous insufficiency (CCSVI) and postulates a controversial correlation between this pathology and multiple sclerosis

During 2010-2011 he was the president of the International Society for Neurovascular Diseases (ISNVD).

Chronic Cerebrospinal Venous Insufficiency – CCSVI

Chronic Cerebrospinal Venous Insufficiency is characterized by defective venous drainage from the brain and spinal cord as a result of outflow obstruction in the extracranial venous system, mainly caused by stenosis, defective valves, hypoplasia, and or compression of the Internal jugular vein, azygos vein. CCSVI was initially brought forth as possible contributing factor to the pathogenesis and clinical manifestations of multiple sclerosis and of other neurodegenerative diseases. Indeed, in 2009 he claimed to have found this vascular condition in an unblinded preliminary study that in over 90% of the participants with multiple sclerosis there were problems in veins draining their brain. He also noted a high level of accumulation of iron deposits in the brain, presumably due to limited blood outflow.

Studies have demonstrated a relationship between tissue iron accumulation and the inflammatory changes associated with chronic venous insufficiency, so the presence of iron may contributes to the neurodegeneration of brain.

Nowadays evidence already exists for reduced perfusion in patients with MS that in turn contributes to neurodegeneration. Current data suggests that defective extracranial venous drainage reduces the perfusion of brain parenchyma. Attention has been drawn to the role of abnormal venous drainage in multiple sclerosis in the form of CCSVI. Recent quantitative studies on cerebral venous drainage demonstrate that flow in the jugular veins is linearly related to global brain perfusion.

According to Zamboni some symptoms of multiple sclerosis in his own wife as well as in 73% of his patients were abated after an endovascular procedure to open these veins.

The theory was controversial. The National Multiple Sclerosis Society had said that, while "there is not yet enough evidence to conclude that obstruction of veins causes MS," that "[Zamboni's] hypothesis on CCSVI and its corrective treatment is a path that must be more fully explored and one that we are supporting with research funding." Since 2010, there has been more research that disputes the Zamboni theory.

On November 28, 2017, Zamboni admitted that balloon venous angioplasty cannot be indiscriminately applied to all patients affected by relapsing remitting MS with associated CCSVI on the basis of "a double-blind randomized controlled trial versus sham therapy. A further expanded analysis of the same double blinded randomized sham controlled trial (Brave Dreams)  showed that venoplasty decreases new cerebral lesions at 1 year in a wider patients population which includes also secondary progressive MS. Further post hoc analysis demonstrated the need to select patients. Patients appropriate for venoplasty, according to the morphology of venous malformation, were more likely to be free from accumulation of new cerebral lesions at MRI.

Research on Chronic Venous Insufficiency - CVI
Zamboni has conducted research on lower extremity Chronic venous insufficiency, testing a minimally invasive and conservative treatment of the saphenous vein: the CHIVA method. On this topic he conducted several randomized clinical trials  and published books.

The CHIVA and the stripping methods are equivalent regarding recurrence of varicose veins, but the CHIVA method may slightly reduce nerve injury and hematoma. The CHIVA method is also equivalent to either radio frequency ablation or endovenous laser therapy regarding recurrence and side effects.

Cell therapies for the treatment of severe vascular ulcerations of the lower limbs are another Zamboni field of study. Randomized studies with autologous stem-cell derived from adipose tissue were conducted by his team.

Research on physiology of cerebral venous drainage
The cerebral venous return was investigated by Professor Zamboni also in the Space, as PI of the study Drain Brain of the International Space Station, promoted by NASA, ESA and ASI. A novel post processing analysis of jugular vein ultrasound and strain gauge plethysmography allowed to monitor the astronaut cerebral venous drainage in microgravity condition. Space trials involved the Italian astronaut Samantha Cristoforetti.

Zamboni also described other anomalies of cerebral venous return which generates neurological symptoms, as well as models in physiology of brain drainage

Diagnosis on painting

Initially started as a hobby, identify disease processes in paintings and canvas is lately one of the Professor Zamboni’ research fields.
Diagnosis ranges from the Raphael's Michelangelo, Rembrandt's Bathsheba at Her Bath and Caravaggio's Bacchus. In "The medical enigma of Rembrandt's Bathsheba", Zamboni solves the mystery of the controversial detail of the woman's left breast, furrowed by an irregular, slightly swollen mark of a color between bluish and brownish. The model for the Bathsheba, admired by millions of visitors to the Louvre, was suffering from thrombophlebitis of a superficial vein of the breast, a condition described by Mondor in 1939," states the professor. So not mastitis or carcinoma, as believed for centuries.
According to Zamboni, the varicose veins on the legs and knees are evident in Michelangelo, in the role of Heraclitus, frescoed by Raphael in The School of Athens. The evident anemia, brown skin, and acanthosis nigricans of Young Sick Bacchus of Caravaggio exhibited at the Galleria Borghese in Rome, according to Zamboni suggest the diagnosis of Addison's disease, a condition described in the 1800s affecting the adrenal glands.

Works

Awards and recognition

Zamboni was appointed "Commander" of the Order of Merit of the Italian Republic in 2017.

He is listed on topitalianscientists.org.

References

External links
Paolo Zamboni
Paolo Zamboni on Google scholar
Paolo Zamboni research profile on BiomedExperts

1957 births
Living people
Italian vascular surgeons
Physicians from Ferrara
Academic staff of the University of Ferrara